This article lists all power stations in Venezuela.  Although Venezuela has one of the world's largest hydroelectric generating plants, its energy consumption is dominated by oil and gas.

Gas

Hydroelectric

See also 

 Energy policy of Venezuela
 List of power stations in South America
 List of largest power stations in the world

References 

Venezuela
Power stations in Venezuela
Energy in Venezuela
Power stations